John E. McIntyre is an American journalist and copy editor. McIntyre is a charter member and two-term president of the American Copy Editors Society.

Life and career
McIntyre was born in Kentucky and grew up in Elizaville, in Fleming County, Kentucky. He graduated from Fleming County High School in Flemingsburg, Kentucky in 1969. He then earned a bachelor's degree in English from Michigan State University in 1973. From 1973 to 1979 he attended Syracuse University, earning a master's degree in English but leaving without completing his doctorate.

From 1980 to 1986 McIntyre worked as a copy editor at The Cincinnati Enquirer. He became a copy editor at The Baltimore Sun in 1986. On April 29, 2009, McIntyre was laid off by The Sun. He was rehired in 2010 to serve as the newspaper's Night Content Production Manager.

McIntyre is also an affiliate (adjunct) instructor at Loyola College in Maryland. He maintains a blog called "You Don't Say" on the Sun website, discussing a variety of topics including grammar usage, journalism, and copy editing.

He is the author of two books published by Apprentice House Press at Loyola University Maryland: "The Old Editor Says: Maxims for Writing and Editing" (2013) and "Bad Advicer: The Most Unreliable Counsel Available on grammar, Usage, and Writing" (2020).

References

External links
You Don't Say on Blogspot.com previous blog
You Don't Say column via The Baltimore Sun, archive through January 2012
You Don't Say column via The Baltimore Sun, archive February 2012 to present

American copy editors
American bloggers
The Baltimore Sun people
People from Kentucky
Michigan State University alumni
Syracuse University alumni
Living people
Year of birth missing (living people)
The Cincinnati Enquirer people
21st-century American non-fiction writers